Treaty is an unincorporated community in Liberty Township, Wabash County, in the U.S. state of Indiana.

History
Treaty was founded in the mid-1870s, and was named after the nearby Treaty Creek. A post office was established at Treaty in 1874, and remained in operation until it was discontinued in 1935.

Geography

References

Unincorporated communities in Wabash County, Indiana
Unincorporated communities in Indiana